David Earl McGill (October 25, 1901 – September 6, 1981) was a Canadian athlete who competed in the 5000 metres at the 1924 Summer Olympics.

References

External links
 

1901 births
1981 deaths
Sportspeople from Manitoba
Olympic track and field athletes of Canada
Athletes (track and field) at the 1924 Summer Olympics
Canadian male long-distance runners